Hibbard is a surname. Notable people with the surname include:

 Aldro Hibbard (1886–1972), American painter
 Bill Hibbard, American scientist
 Brian Hibbard (1946–2012), Welsh actor and singer
 Claude W. Hibbard (1905–1973), American paleontologist
 David Hibbard (stage actor), American stage actor
 David Sutherland Hibbard (died 1966), American missionary and educator
 Edna Hibbard (1895–1942), American actress
 Ellery Albee Hibbard (1826–1903), American politician from New Hampshire
 Fred Hibbard, pseudonym of Fred Fishback (1894–1925), American silent film director
 Frederick Hibbard (1881–1950), American sculptor
 George A. Hibbard (1864–1910), American politician from Boston
 George E. Hibbard (1924–1991), American collector of Tibetan art
 Greg Hibbard, American baseball player
 Hall Hibbard (1903–1996), American aviation engineer and administrator
 Harry Hibbard (1816–1872), American politician from New Hampshire
 James Hibbard, American cyclist
 Richard Hibbard, Welsh rugby player
 Thomas N. Hibbard, computer scientist
 Walter R. Hibbard Jr. (1918–2010), American metallurgist and educator

Fictional
 Andrew Hibbard, character in Rex Stout's The League of Frightened Men

Places

United States
 Hibbard, Idaho
 Hibbard, Indiana
 Hibbard, Montana
 Charles H. Hibbard House, Illinois

See also
 Hibbard & Darrin, French coachbuilder
 Hibberd

References